The Fixer is a 1968 British drama film based on the 1966 semi-biographical novel of the same name, written by Bernard Malamud. It was directed by John Frankenheimer and stars Alan Bates.

Plot
The film is based on Bernard Malamud's novel The Fixer, which in turn was inspired by the 1913 trial of Menahem Mendel Beilis, a Russian Jew who was falsely accused of having ritually murdered a Ukrainian boy named Andrei Yushchinsky, an example of the Blood Libel.

Cast

Oscar nomination
Alan Bates was nominated for an Academy Award for Best Actor in a Leading Role.

External links

References

British drama films
British biographical films
1968 films
Films directed by John Frankenheimer
Films based on American novels
Films about antisemitism
Films with screenplays by Dalton Trumbo
1968 drama films
Metro-Goldwyn-Mayer films
Films set in 1913
Films set in Russia
Films set in Kyiv
Films shot in Hungary
Films shot at MGM-British Studios
1960s English-language films
1960s British films